Conus ochroleucus, common name the prefect cone, is a species of sea snail, a marine gastropod mollusk in the family Conidae, the cone snails and their allies.

Like all species within the genus Conus, these snails are predatory and venomous. They are capable of "stinging" humans, therefore live ones should be handled carefully or not at all.

Subspecies
 Conus ochroleucus ochroleucus Gmelin, 1791
 Conus ochroleucus tmetus Tomlin, 1937 (synonyms : Asprella ochroleuca tmetus (Tomlin, J.R. le B., 1937); Conus pilkeyi Petuch, 1974; Conus sulciferus A. Adams, 1855; Phasmoconus pilkeyi Petuch, E.J., 1974)

Description
The size of an adult shell varies between 40mm and 88mm. The shell is long and narrow, distantly grooved towards the base. Its color is yellowish brown, variously shaded, with a rather indistinct median lighter band. The white aperture is somewhat wider anteriorly. The striate and acuminate spire is maculated with yellowish brown and white.

Distribution
This species is found in the Pacific Ocean off Taiwan, the Philippines, Papua New Guinea, Indonesia and Fiji; in the Indian Ocean off India.

Gallery

References

 Bruguière, 1792 Histoire naturelle des vers. In: Encyclopédie méthodique, vol. 1(2), p. 345–758
 Filmer R.M. (2001). A Catalogue of Nomenclature and Taxonomy in the Living Conidae 1758 – 1998. Backhuys Publishers, Leiden. 388pp.
 Tucker J.K. (2009). Recent cone species database. September 4, 2009 Edition
 Tucker J.K. & Tenorio M.J. (2009) Systematic classification of Recent and fossil conoidean gastropods. Hackenheim: Conchbooks. 296 pp.
 Petit, R. E. (2009). George Brettingham Sowerby, I, II & III: their conchological publications and molluscan taxa. Zootaxa. 2189: 1–218
 Puillandre N., Duda T.F., Meyer C., Olivera B.M. & Bouchet P. (2015). One, four or 100 genera? A new classification of the cone snails. Journal of Molluscan Studies. 81: 1–23

External links
 The Conus Biodiversity website
 
 
 Cone Shells – Knights of the Sea
 Holotype in MNHN, Paris

ochroleucus
Gastropods described in 1791